The Sword and the Song is a 1986 Singaporean historical series produced by Singapore Broadcasting Corporation. The drama focuses on a pair of great monarchs during the 10th century: Song dynasty's fearless and heroic warrior Zhao Kuangyin and Southern Tang's compassionate and sentimental poet-artist Li Yu, and how their vastly different personalities sealed the fates of their respective countries. The stories about Zhao Kuangyin are to some extent based on Wu Xuan's 1768 Chinese novel Fei Long Quan Zhuan (飛龍全傳).

Two subsequent TV series, the 1996 Taiwanese drama Love, Sword, Mountain & River and the 2005 Chinese drama How Much Sorrow Do You Have feature virtually the same main characters, though the plots differ somewhat.

Cast and characters

Northern China (Later Han, Later Zhou, Song dynasty)
Lin Mingzhe as Zhao Kuangyin
Chen Tianwen as Zhao Kuangyi, Zhao Kuangyin's younger brother
Chen Tianxiang as Zhao Hongyin, Zhao Kuangyi's father
Chen Juanjuan as Du Siniang, Zhao Kuangyi's mother
Liu Qianyi as Liu Chengyou, Later Han's emperor
Hu Shuzhen as He Jinchan
Yan Bingliang as Han Tong
Guo Chongyi as Han Wei, Han Tong's son
Gu Rongfang as Guo Wei
Tang Wentao as Chai Rong
Hong Peixing as Shi Shouxin
Lin Jinchi as Wei Yixiao
An Zheming as Zhao Pu
Ye Shipin as Zheng En
Hong Huifang as Tao Sanchun

Southern China (Southern Tang, Chu)
Li Wenhai as Li Yu
Wu Weiqiang as Li Jing, Li Yu's father and Southern Tang's emperor
Zhu Yuye as Empress Zhong, Li Yu's mother
Chen Xiuhuan as Zhou Ehuang
Zheng Wanling as Zhou Huimin
Yang Junhe as Li Jingsui, Li Yu's uncle
Huang Shinan as Li Hongji, Li Yu's older brother
Jin Jugong as Li Congshan, Li Yu's younger brother
Liu Qiulian as Huang Feng
Michelle Chia as Huang Feng (child)
Fu Shuiyu as Liuzhu
Zeng Yaofeng as Huangfu Jixun

External links
Opening on YouTube

1986 Singaporean television series debuts
Television series set in the Five Dynasties and Ten Kingdoms period
Television series set in the Northern Song